Melaleuca Field is a stadium in Idaho Falls, Idaho. It is primarily used for baseball, and is the home field of the Idaho Falls Chukars independent Minor League Baseball team.  It was built during the Pioneer League 2006–07 offseason. American Legion and local high school games are also played at the field.

By 2004, the old stadium that used to sit on the same lot, McDermott Field, was outdated, deteriorating, and viewed as an unsuitable baseball venue. In May of that year, the Chukars approached the City of Idaho Falls about a major renovation; the estimated cost was $3.35 million. After the city agreed to allocate $2 million toward the project, the Chukars started a "Step Up To The Plate" fundraising campaign to come up with the remaining $1.35 million. Despite a fundraising campaign launched by the city of Idaho Falls, a sharp rise in anticipated construction costs resulted in a budget shortfall of half a million dollars. Idaho Falls multi-level marketing company Melaleuca provided $600,000 to complete the construction and the stadium was renamed Melaleuca Field on June 22, 2007.

The old McDermott Field stadium was torn down on October 30, 2006, and the new Melaleuca Field stadium was dedicated on June 22, 2007. The new stadium includes a seating capacity of 3,400, eight luxury boxes, two large concession booths, and a sponsored hot tub on the right field line.

Features
The grandstand includes 1,200 box seats, 1,459 bench seats with backs, eight custom suites with balcony seating, a large press box, two large concession booths, a souvenir shop and various offices. The playing surface is natural grass (Kentucky bluegrass).

The concourse wraps around the playing field with a picnic area on the third base side and a party area with hot tub on the first base side. A separate building next to the field contains two locker rooms and extra storage.

Awards

In 2007, Melaleuca Field was awarded “Best Ballpark Renovation” in the inaugural Ballpark Digest Awards of Distinction. In 2015, the field was selected by fans as the top rookie-level ballpark in Ballpark Digest's Best of the Ballparks contest and was named fourth best rookie-level ballpark by the Digest. On August 14, 2017, Melaleuca Field welcomed the one millionth fan in the new ballpark's history.

References

External links
- Melaleuca Field Official Website
Melaleuca Field Information - Idaho Falls Chukars

Baseball venues in Idaho
Minor league baseball venues
Buildings and structures in Idaho Falls, Idaho
Tourist attractions in Bonneville County, Idaho
2007 establishments in Idaho
Sports venues completed in 2007